Heberto Castillo Jr. (born July 21, 1969 in Panama City, Panama) is a retired jockey in American Thoroughbred horse racing. He was born into a family involved in the sport. His father was a jockey and his mother Gloria was a horse trainer in Florida. His sister, Rita, married jockey José Santos in 1997.

In 1986, Castillo rode in his first race at Fair Grounds Race Course in New Orleans, Louisiana and four years later won the riding title at Florida's Calder Race Course. Among his major career wins were two Donn Handicaps in 1993 and 1994, the 1998 Hialeah Turf Cup Handicap, and the 2000 Metropolitan Handicap.

Castillo retired in 2006.

References

External links
 The 1994 Donn Handicap video at YouTube.com
 Photo of Heberto Castillo Jr. at Flicker.com

Year-end charts

1969 births
Living people
American jockeys
Sportspeople from Panama City
Panamanian emigrants to the United States